Berwick Armory, also known as the Brigadier General Edward L. Davis Armory, is a historic National Guard armory located at Berwick, Columbia County, Pennsylvania.  It is a "T"-shaped brick building on a stone foundation. The one-story Tudor Revival-style drill hall was built in 1922. The drill hall has a gambrel roof. The two-story American Craftsman-style administrative section was added in 1930.  The armory measures 7,500 square feet.

It was added to the National Register of Historic Places in 1991.

References

Armories on the National Register of Historic Places in Pennsylvania
Tudor Revival architecture in Pennsylvania
Infrastructure completed in 1930
Buildings and structures in Columbia County, Pennsylvania
National Register of Historic Places in Columbia County, Pennsylvania